There are two conventional sets ASCII substitutions for the letters in the Esperanto alphabet that have diacritics, as well as a number of graphic work-arounds.

The diacritics of Esperanto were designed with a French manual typewriter in mind, as French was the international language at the time Esperanto was developed. French typewriters have a dead key for the circumflex that can be used in combination with any other key. In handwritten Esperanto, the diacritics pose no problem. However, since the Esperanto letters with diacritics do not appear on standard computer keyboard layouts (French computer keyboards, unlike manual typewriters, typically assign the circumflex only to letters that bear it in French orthography), various alternative methods have been devised for inputting them or substituting them in type. The original method, suggested by Zamenhof for people who did not have access to a French typewriter, was a set of digraphs in h, now known as the "Zamenhof-system" or "h-system". With the rise of computer word processing, the so-called "x-system" has become equally popular. With the advent of Unicode and more easily customized computer keyboards, the need for such workarounds has lessened.

ASCII transliteration systems 
There are two alternative orthographies in common use, which replace the circumflex letters with either h digraphs or x digraphs. There are also graphic work-arounds such as approximating the circumflexes with carets.

H-system 

The original method of working around the diacritics was developed by the creator of Esperanto himself, L. L. Zamenhof.

The word  should be placed after , but sorted in the h-system,  would appear before .

X-system 

X-digraphs solve those problems of the h-system:

 x is not a letter in the Esperanto alphabet, so its use introduces no ambiguity.
 The digraphs are now nearly always correctly sorted after their single-letter counterparts; for example,  (for ) comes after , while h-system  comes before it. The sorting only fails in the infrequent case of a z in compound or unassimilated words; for example, the compound word  ("to reuse") would be sorted after  (for  "rheumatism").

The x-system has become as popular as the h-system, but it has long been perceived as being contrary to the Fundamento de Esperanto. However, in its 2007 decision, the Akademio de Esperanto has issued general permission for the use of surrogate systems for the representation of the diacritical letters of Esperanto, under the condition that this is being done only "when the circumstances do not permit the use of proper diacritics, and when due to a special need the h-system fixed in the Fundamento is not convenient." This provision covers situations such as using the x-system as a technical solution (to store data in plain ASCII) yet still displaying proper Unicode characters to the end user.

Aux, for example, is a word in both languages ( in Esperanto). Any automatic conversion of the text will alter the French words as well as the Esperanto. A few English words like "auxiliary" and "Euxine" can also suffer from such search-and-replace routines. "" produces "aux".

Graphic work-arounds 
There are several ad hoc workarounds used in email or on the internet, where the proper letters are often not supported, as seen also in non-ASCII orthographies such as German. These "slipped-hat" conventions make use of the caret (^) or greater than sign (>) to represent the circumflex. For example, ŝanco may be written ^sanco, s^anco, or s>anco. However, they have generally fallen out of favor. Before the internet age,  had proposed shifting the caret onto the following vowel, since French circumflex vowels are supported in printing houses. That is, one would write ehôsângôj cîujâude for the nonsense phrase eĥoŝanĝoj ĉiuĵaŭde ("echo-change every Thursday"). However, this proposal has never been adopted.

See also 

 Inputting Esperanto

References

External links
eoconv – a tool to convert text between various orthographic substitutions

Orthography: reform
Orthography reform